A kissing gate is a gate that allows people, but not livestock, to pass through.

The normal construction is a half-round, rectangular, trapezoidal or V-shaped part-enclosure with the free end of a hinged gate trapped between its arms. When the gate is touching an arm it must be pulled or pushed to pass through. The gate may need to be pushed to give access to the small enclosure, and when in the enclosure the person pulls the gate past the bulk of the enclosure to exit. Some examples have latches. Most are installed self-closing, to the side away from the pasture (livestock field), by hinge geometry, a spring or weight.

The gate may be made large enough to fit wheelchairs and the like. Alternatively, to allow pushchairs, wheelchairs, bicycles, and other things too large to pass through, a conventional gate with a less consistent swing-back or default animal-proof mechanism may be nearby, or an additional latch may allow it to open more fully.

The name comes from the gate merely "kissing" (touching) the inside of the enclosure. It reliably forms a barrier rather than needing to be securely latched on each use. Examples, as with stiles, on footpaths published as accessible are those replaced, improved or supplemented by gates.

See also 
 Bump gate
 Rambler gate

Further reading 
 Kissing gates are included in British Standard BS5709:2018. This extends to their recommended design, signs and maintenance. The standard is functional rather than prescriptive.

References

External links 
 
 

Types of gates